Wolverhampton South West is a constituency created in 1950 represented in the House of Commons of the UK Parliament since 2019 by Stuart Anderson of the Conservative Party.

It was represented by the Conservative Party for 47 years after its formation, with Labour winning it for the first time in their 1997 landslide victory. The Conservatives regained the seat in 2010, only for Labour to regain it at the next general election in 2015, before losing it again in 2019 to the Conservative Party.

The constituency was held by Enoch Powell from 1950 to 1974, covering his unsuccessful bid for the Conservative Party leadership in 1965 and his controversial Rivers of Blood speech, which criticised mass immigration, especially Commonwealth immigration to Britain, in 1968.

Members of Parliament

Constituency profile 
This, in the 21st century, repeatedly marginal seat contains a mix of different areas; St Peter's, Graiseley and Park are relatively deprived inner city wards, with significant ethnic minority populations, mainly of Asian origin and are Labour voting-areas. Penn and Merry Hill are more mixed and suburban with mostly Conservative voters in times of economic prosperity. Tettenhall Regis and Tettenhall Wightwick are affluent suburbs on the western fringe of the West Midlands conurbation and are the strongest Tory wards in the seat.

The seat includes Molineux stadium, home to Wolverhampton Wanderers F.C.

Boundaries 

Wolverhampton South West is one of three constituencies covering the city of Wolverhampton, covering the city centre (including the University and Civic Centre) as well as western and south-western parts of the city. The boundaries run south from the city centre towards Penn and north-west towards Tettenhall.

1950–1955: The County Borough of Wolverhampton wards of Blakenhall and St John's, Graiseley, Penn, St George's, St Mark's and Merridale, St Matthew's, and St Philip's.

1955–1974: As above plus Park.

1974–1983: The County Borough of Wolverhampton wards of Graiseley, Merry Hill, Park, Penn, St Peter's, Tettenhall Regis, and Tettenhall Wightwick.

1983–2010: The Metropolitan Borough wards as named above

2010–present: The City of Wolverhampton wards as named above
 
In the Sixth Periodic Review of Westminster constituencies, Wolverhampton South West was due to be abolished. Its proposed replacement, called Wolverhampton West, would lose St. Peter's and gain Bushbury North, Oxley, and Blakenhall.

History 
Prominent frontbenchers
The unit is heavily associated with the controversial Conservative politician Enoch Powell who was MP for the seat from 1950 until 1974, when he departed to the Ulster Unionist Party. It was during this time that he served in Edward Heath's shadow cabinet, from which he was dismissed in 1968 after his controversial Rivers of Blood speech in which he predicted severe civil unrest if mass immigration from the Commonwealth continued. This speech was reportedly the result of Powell's meeting with a woman in the constituency who was the last white person living in her street.

He was succeeded by fellow Conservative Nicholas Budgen, who held the seat until 1997.  Budgen is best known as one of the Maastricht rebels of the mid-1990s.

Summary of results 
Wolverhampton South West returned Conservative until a Labour candidate gained it in their 1997 landslide. Budgen was defeated in the 1997 election by Labour's Jenny Jones, a landslide victory for the party. As the next general election loomed, she announced that she would not be seeking re-election. From the 2001 general election, the constituency was represented by Rob Marris of the Labour Party for nine years until he lost it in the 2010 general election to Paul Uppal of the Conservative Party, by a margin of 691 votes. Marris regained the seat from Uppal at the 2015 general election. The 2015 result gave the seat the 14th-smallest majority of Labour's 232 seats by percentage of majority. In 2017, despite Marris standing down after 11 (non-consecutive) years as an MP and Uppal standing for a third time, the new Labour candidate, Eleanor Smith, more than doubled the Labour majority. In 2019, riding the surge from Boris Johnson's Conservative Party, Stuart Anderson was elected as the new Conservative MP for the constituency.

Other parties candidates
Of the four other candidates standing in 2015, the UKIP candidate kept his deposit by winning more than 5% of the vote, in the year before the 2016 EU referendum. He failed to do so in the 2017 election.

Turnout
Turnout has ranged from 87.2% in 1950 to 62.1% in 2001 and in 2005.

Elections

Elections in the 2010s

Elections in the 2000s

Elections in the 1990s

Elections in the 1980s

Elections in the 1970s

Elections in the 1960s

Elections in the 1950s

See also 
 List of Members of Parliament for Wolverhampton
 List of parliamentary constituencies in the West Midlands (county)
 List of parliamentary constituencies in Wolverhampton

Notes

References

External links 
 United Kingdom Election Results
 United Kingdom General Election results since 1832

Parliamentary constituencies in the West Midlands (county)
Parliamentary constituencies in Wolverhampton
Constituencies of the Parliament of the United Kingdom established in 1950